Simon van Zeelst (born 23 February 1994) is a Dutch footballer who plays as a midfielder for Derde Divisie club SteDoCo.

Career
van Zeelst began his career with Willem II and made his professional debut on 6 April 2013 in a 3–1 defeat against PSV Eindhoven. On 1 September 2014, he was sent on loan to RKC Waalwijk until the end of the season.

Honours

Club
Willem II
Eerste Divisie: 2013–14

References

External links
 Voetbal International profile 
 
 

1994 births
Living people
Dutch footballers
Eredivisie players
Eerste Divisie players
Derde Divisie players
Willem II (football club) players
RKC Waalwijk players
JVC Cuijk players
People from Maasdriel
Association football midfielders
Footballers from Gelderland